Speed garage (occasionally known as plus-8) is a genre of electronic dance music, associated with the UK garage scene, of which it is regarded as one of its subgenres.

Characteristics
Speed garage features sped-up NY garage 4-to-the-floor rhythms that are combined with breakbeats. Snares are placed as over the 2nd and the 4th kickdrums, so in other places of the drum pattern. Speed garage tunes have warped, heavy basslines, influenced by jungle and reggae. Sweeping bass is typical for speed garage. It is also typical for speed garage tunes to have a breakdown. Speed garage tunes sometimes featured timestretched vocals. As it is heavily influenced by jungle, speed garage makes heavy use of jungle and dub sound effects, such as gunshots and sirens.

A widely regarded pioneer of the speed garage sound is record producer, DJ and remixer Armand van Helden, whose Dark Garage remix of the Sneaker Pimps' "Spin Spin Sugar" in 1996 helped bring the style of speed garage into the mainstream arena.

Notable songs/remixes
The following is a list of notable songs and official remixes which not only charted but were popular within the speed garage scene:
"Sugar Is Sweeter (Armand's Drum 'n' Bass Mix)" (1996) / "Spin Spin Sugar (Armand's Dark Garage Mix)" (1997) / "Digital (Armand Van Helden's Speed Garage Mix)" (1997) – Armand van Helden
"Dancing for Heaven" (1995) / "Saved My Life" (1996) – Todd Edwards
"Gunman" (1997) / "Kung-Fu" (1998) – 187 Lockdown
"Deeper" (1997) / "God Is a DJ (Serious Danger Remix)" (1998) – Serious Danger
"Hype Funk (Dub)" (1997) – Reach & Spin
"RipGroove" (1997) – Double 99
"Vol. 1 (What You Want What You Need)" (1997) – Industry Standard
"I Refuse (What You Want)" (1997) – Somore featuring Damon Trueitt
"Oh Boy" (1997) – The Fabulous Baker Boys
"Ripped in 2 Minutes" (1998) – A vs B
"A London Thing" (1997) – Scott Garcia
"Something Goin' On (Loop Da Loop Uptown / Downtown Mix)" (1997) – Loop Da Loop
"Superstylin'" (2001) – Groove Armada

References

External links
Discogs listing for Spin Spin Sugar
Speed Garage fans community

 
UK garage genres
English styles of music
Electronic dance music genres